Simphiwe Nongqayi (born 18 February 1972) is a South African former professional boxer who competed from 2002 to 2012. He held the IBF super-flyweight title from 2009 to 2010 and challenged for the WBO junior-featherweight title in 2011. As an amateur Nongqayi represented South Africa at the 1998 Commonwealth Games.

Professional career 
Nongqayi won the vacant IBF super-flyweight title by defeating Jorge Arce on 15 September 2009. He retained the title on 19 April 2010, fighting Malik Bouziane to a majority draw, but then lost the title to Juan Alberto Rosas on 31 July 2010.

Nonggayi suffered a fourth round stoppage loss to Arce on 24 September 2011 in a bout for the WBO junior-featherweight title, and retired from boxing in 2012.

Professional boxing record

References

External links

1972 births
Living people
People from Amahlathi Local Municipality
Xhosa people
Super-flyweight boxers
Boxers at the 1998 Commonwealth Games
Commonwealth Games competitors for South Africa
International Boxing Federation champions
South African male boxers